Arefabad may refer to:
 Arefabad, Razavi Khorasan
 Arefabad, Chabahar, Sistan and Baluchestan Province
 Arefabad, Zahedan, Sistan and Baluchestan Province